Soulsbyville is an unincorporated census-designated place in Tuolumne County, California. The population was 2,215 at the time of the 2010 census, up from 1,729 at the time of the 2000 census. Formerly a California Gold Rush town, Soulsbyville is now registered as a California Historical Landmark.

Geography
Soulsbyville is located at  (37.994999, -120.260258).

According to the United States Census Bureau, the community has a total area of 3.0 square miles (7.8 km), 99.80% of it land and 0.20% water.

Demographics

2010
The 2010 United States Census reported that Soulsbyville had a population of 2,215. The racial makeup of Soulsbyville was 2,038 (92.0%) White, 3 (0.1%) African American, 41 (1.9%) Native American, 13 (0.6%) Asian, 2 (0.1%) Pacific Islander, 38 (1.7%) from other races, and 80 (3.6%) from two or more races. Hispanic or Latino of any race were 206 persons (9.3%).

The Census reported that 2,215 people (100% of the population) lived in households, 0 (0%) lived in non-institutionalized group quarters, and 0 (0%) were institutionalized.

There were 871 households, of which 257 (29.5%) had children under the age of 18 living in them, 488 (56.0%) were opposite-sex married couples living together, 72 (8.3%) had a female householder with no husband present, 41 (4.7%) had a male householder with no wife present. There were 49 (5.6%) unmarried opposite-sex partnerships, and 4 (0.5%) same-sex married couples or partnerships. 200 households (23.0%) were made up of individuals, and 82 (9.4%) had someone living alone who was 65 years of age or older. The average household size was 2.54. There were 601 families (69.0% of all households); the average family size was 3.01.

502 people (22.7%) were under the age of 18, 163 people (7.4%) aged 18 to 24, 490 people (22.1%) aged 25 to 44, 710 people (32.1%) aged 45 to 64, and 350 people (15.8%) who were 65 years of age or older. The median age was 42.9 years. For every 100 females, there were 101.4 males. For every 100 females age 18 and over, there were 97.6 males.

The homeowner vacancy rate was 3.0%; the rental vacancy rate was 2.4%. 1,673 people (75.5% of the population) lived in owner-occupied housing units and 542 people (24.5%) lived in rental housing units.

2000
At the 2000 census, there were 1,729 people, 674 households and 485 families residing in the community. The racial makeup of the community was 92.19% White, 2.20% Native American, 0.35% Asian, 0.12% Pacific Islander, 2.95% from other races, and 2.20% from two or more races. Hispanic or Latino of any race were 7.98% of the population.

There were 674 households, of which 31.2% had children under the age of 18 living with them, 58.8% were married couples living together, 9.2% had a female householder with no husband present, and 28.0% were non-families. 21.8% of all households were made up of individuals, and 9.8% had someone living alone who was 65 years of age or older. The average household size was 2.57 and the average family size was 3.01.

26.5% of the population were under the age of 18, 6.7% from 18 to 24, 24.8% from 25 to 44, 25.3% from 45 to 64, and 16.7% who were 65 years of age or older. The median age was 41 years. For every 100 females, there were 102.2 males. For every 100 females age 18 and over, there were 94.2 males.

The median household income was $42,500 and the median family income was $45,625. Males had a median income of $34,516 compared with $18,906 for females. The per capita income for the community was $18,514. About 11.7% of families and 15.6% of the population were below the poverty line, including 25.3% of those under age 18 and none of those age 65 or over.

History 
Soulsbyville is named after Ben Soulsby, who resided in the area during the California Gold Rush. Soulsby discovered gold, and the mine and gold mill (and town, and school and ridge and ditch) named after him was near the intersection of Community Drive and Soulsbyville Road.

Government

California Historical Landmark
Soulsbyville is a California Historical Landmark.
California Historical Landmark number 420 reads:
NO. 420 SOULSBYVILLE - Site of the famous Soulsby Mine (discovered by Benjamin Soulsby), Soulsbyville is the first community in Tuolumne County to be founded (1855) entirely upon the operation of a lode mine. First to work the mine were hard rock miners from Cornwall, England, the first group of 499 Cornishmen arrived in 1858

See also
California Historical Landmarks in Tuolumne County, California

References

Census-designated places in Tuolumne County, California
Census-designated places in California
California Historical Landmarks